Albert Ernest Newbury (29 January 1891 – 1 April 1941) was an Australian artist who was associated with the Australian tonalist movement.

Career

Newbury was born in Melbourne, one of the five sons of Samuel Newbury (1854–1930) and his wife Jessie Susannah Newbury née Dowsett. Samuel was the headmaster of Albert Park Grammar School; the Congregationalist minister Alfred Charles Newbury was an elder brother. Albert spent most of his childhood in Geelong. In 1909, at the age of 18, Newbury entered the National Gallery of Victoria Art School, Melbourne, where he studied under Frederick McCubbin and Bernard Hall. In 1916, Newbury studied under Max Meldrum who influenced his work.

Newbury won the Hugh Ramsay prize for portrait-painting in 1913 – his two pictures being placed first and second.

Newbury held a joint exhibition in 1917 with Richard McCann, and gradually established a reputation for the simplicity and spaciousness of his work. Most of his paintings were landscapes, but he also did some very good portraits.

After the death of William Beckwith McInnes in 1939 and the appointment of Charles Wheeler as master of the painting school at the National Gallery of Victoria, Melbourne, Newbury was made master in the school of drawing.

However, Newbury became ill soon afterwards and died at Eltham near Melbourne on 1 April 1941. Newbury married Ruth Trumble who survived him with one son.

His work is represented in the galleries at Melbourne, Sydney, Adelaide, Ballarat, Geelong, and at Canberra.

References

External links
Albert Newbury at Ask Art

1891 births
1941 deaths
20th-century Australian painters
20th-century Australian male artists
Australian male painters
Artists from Melbourne
National Gallery of Victoria Art School alumni